Benoist is both a given name and a surname.

Benoist may also refer to:

Places
Le Mesnil-Benoist, commune in the Calvados department in the Basse-Normandie region in northwestern France 
Plessis-Saint-Benoist commune in the Essonne department in Île-de-France in northern France
Saint-Benoist-sur-Mer, commune (in the Vendée department in the Pays de la Loire region in western France
Saint-Benoist-sur-Vanne, commune in the Aube department in north-central France

Aircraft
Benoist Aircraft, an American aircraft manufacturing company
Benoist Land Tractor Type XII, an American airplane of 1912, one of the first enclosed-cockpit, tractor-configuration aircraft 
Benoist XIV, a small American biplane flying boat of 1913

Other uses
Benoist (tea), a type of tea popularized by the Japanese drama Densha Otoko

See also
Condé Benoist Pallen (1858-1929), American Catholic editor and author
Benois
Benoit (disambiguation)